The 2018–19 CSA 4-Day Franchise Series was a first-class cricket competition that took place in South Africa from 26 September 2018 to 31 January 2019. It was the first edition not to be sponsored by Sunfoil, after they decided not to renew their sponsorship. Lions won the tournament, after beating Warriors in the final match of the competition. They won the fixture, with just nine deliveries left in the game, to gain enough bonus points to overtake the Cape Cobras. Titans were the defending champions, but finished in last place, with just one win in their ten matches.

Cricket South Africa announced that the competition would be split into two sections, the first from September to November, and the second from December and January. This was used to help prepare the national side for the Test series against Pakistan, which was played in December 2018 and January 2019. During the break, the first edition of the Mzansi Super League also took place.

Points table

Fixtures

Round 1

Round 2

Round 3

Round 4

Round 5

Round 6

Round 7

Round 8

Round 9

Round 10

References

External links
 Series home at ESPN Cricinfo

South African domestic cricket competitions
CSA 4-Day Franchise Series
2018–19 South African cricket season
Sunfoil Series